Niina Anneli Kelo (born 26 March 1980 in Järvenpää) is a Finnish athlete who specialises in the heptathlon.

Kelo represented Finland at the 2008 Summer Olympics where she finished 23rd in the heptathlon, scoring a season best of 5911 points.

Achievements

References

External links 

 

1980 births
Living people
People from Järvenpää
Finnish heptathletes
Olympic athletes of Finland
Athletes (track and field) at the 2008 Summer Olympics
Competitors at the 2003 Summer Universiade
Competitors at the 2005 Summer Universiade